Art Deco of the 20s and 30s is an art history book by English historian Bevis Hillier. It was initially published in 1968 by Studio Vista. The author discusses how the style of cubism, expressionism, Ancient Egyptian art, Mayan art, and so on influenced Art Deco, and how Art Deco itself changed the style of disciplines as various as modern architecture, jewelry, ceramics, tableware, metalwork, glass, textiles, and many others.

Content
What is Art Deco?
How Art Deco Developed
The Interregnum
Influence of Cubism, Expressionism, Futurism, Vorticism.
Influence of the Russian Ballet
Influence of American Indian Art
Influence of Ancient Egyptian Art
The Twenties
The Thirties
The Arts of Art Deco
The Revival

Influence
According to historian Thomas Mellins, it was the publication of this book in 1968 that popularised the term Art Deco. Otherwise, the genre may have been referred to as Art Moderne.

See also

Art Deco Architecture: Design, Decoration and Detail from the Twenties and Thirties
 Art Deco Jewelry estate jewelry
 Art Deco stamps
 International style
 List of Art Deco architecture
 Paris architecture of the Belle Époque
 Paris between the Wars (1919–1939)

References

External links
Profile on Google Books

1968 non-fiction books
Art Deco
English art
English-language books
Art history books